Tatum School District may refer to:
 Tatum Municipal Schools (New Mexico)
 Tatum Independent School District (Texas)